Selwyn Brown (born September 28, 1965) is a former American football defensive back. He played for the Tampa Bay Buccaneers in 1988.

References

1965 births
Living people
American football defensive backs
Miami Hurricanes football players
Tampa Bay Buccaneers players